San Lorenzo in Banale (San Lorénz in local dialect) was a comune (municipality) in Trentino in the northern Italian region Trentino-Alto Adige/Südtirol, located about  west of Trento. It was merged with Dorsino on January 1, 2015, to form a new municipality, San Lorenzo Dorsino.

Food
Ciuìga is a locally produced sausage made with pork, turnips, and pepper.  It is then smoked using juniper branches and served during the winter months accompanied with polenta, sauerkraut, or potatoes. The name originates from the local dialect word for pine cone, because of its shape and size. It is also a Slow Food presidium.

References

Cities and towns in Trentino-Alto Adige/Südtirol